A passport stamp is an inked impression in a passport typically made by rubber stamp upon entering or exiting a territory.

Passport stamps may occasionally take the form of sticker stamps, such as entry stamps from Japan and South Korea. Depending on nationality, a visitor may not receive a stamp at all (unless specifically requested), such as an EU or EFTA citizen travelling to an EU or EFTA country, Albania, or North Macedonia. Most countries issue exit stamps in addition to entry stamps. A few countries issue only entry stamps, including Canada, El Salvador, Ireland, New Zealand, the United Kingdom and the United States.

Australia, Hong Kong, Israel, Macau and Singapore do not stamp passports upon entry nor exit. These countries or regions issue landing slips instead, with the exception of Australia who do not issue any form of physical evidence of entry. Argentina and Singapore send digital entry receipts containing conditions of entry via email. Visas may also take the form of passport stamps.

Because there is no national authority, Antarctica does not have a passport stamp.  However, the various bases there may provide souvenir ones on request.

Use

Border control officials often place stamps in passports as part of their immigration control or customs procedures. This endorsement can serve many different purposes. In the United Kingdom the immigration stamp in the passport includes the formal "leave to enter" granted on entry to the country to a person who is subject to immigration control. Alternatively, the stamps activate and/or acknowledge the continuing leave conferred by the individual's entry clearance. Other authorities, such as those in Schengen member states, simply stamp a passport with a date stamp that does not indicate any duration and this stamp is taken to mean either that the person is deemed to have permission to remain for 90 days within a 180-day period or an alternative period as shown on their visa, whichever is shorter. In Japan, the passport entry sticker also contains a QR code that allows the immigration official to electronically collect information related to that entry.

Most countries have different stamps for arrivals and departures to make it easier for officers to quickly identify the movements of the person concerned. The colour of the ink or the style of stamp may also provide such information.

Depending on the immigration authority, such stamps are also affixed on other documents that a traveller has to present such as their landing card, boarding card, etc.

In many cases passengers on cruise ships do not receive passport stamps because the entire vessel has been cleared into port. It is often possible to get a souvenir stamp, although this requires finding the immigration office by the dock. In many cases officials are used to such requests and will cooperate. Also, as noted below, some of the smallest European countries will give a stamp on request, either at their border or tourist office charging, at most, a nominal fee.

Overview of passport stamps of countries

Asia

Armenia

Azerbaijan

Bangladesh
Bangladesh stamps all travellers' passports upon both entry and exit. Handwritten scroll numbers on the stamp make it easier to track a person's complete journey – a Bangladeshi leaving Bangladesh would receive a scroll number upon exit; upon entry, the scroll number would be used to access related journey information of the traveller. The same is the case for foreigners, except that the scroll number is given on entry and then used on exit.

The stamps are always in black except the date, which is in red. The stamps feature an arrow at the top left corner, pointing left to denote departure, or pointing right for arrival together with a cartoon of the mode of transport at the top right corner.

Entry stamps are rectangular and exit stamps are oval, exit make it visually easier to trace movements.

Bahrain

Cambodia

China (PRC)
All stamps are applied in red ink. Entry stamps are oval while exit stamps are rectangular. The stamps bear the date and point of entry/exit (in Chinese), as well as an identification code running along the border of the stamps. There is no English on the stamps, except for the "CHINA" written on the stamps. Chinese border control officer also stamps the passenger's boarding pass upon departure with the same stamp that is used for departure.

Georgia

Hong Kong
The Hong Kong Immigration Department used to stamp the passports of visitors entering and leaving Hong Kong (residents using their Hong Kong Identity Card did not receive a stamp). Just prior to and after the 1997 transfer of sovereignty from the UK to the People's Republic of China, arrival and departure stamps were identical at all ports of entry.

For the next 15 years or so, the ink colour of the stamp differentiated the administrative division of the point of entry:
 
 Stamps issued within Hong Kong Island (Hong Kong-Macau Ferry Terminal Control Point, by either sea or air) were in purple ink.
 Stamps issued within Islands District (Hong Kong International Airport Control Point by air) were in black ink.
 Stamps issued within Kowloon (Hung Hom Control Point by trains, Ocean Terminal Control Point and China Ferry Terminal Control Point by sea) were in green ink.
 Stamps issued within New Territories (Sha Tau Kok Control Point, Man Kam To Control Point, Lo Wu Control Point, Lok Ma Chau Control Point, Lok Ma Chau Spur Line Control Point and Shenzhen Bay Control Point by land, Tuen Mun Ferry Terminal Control Point by sea) were in red ink.

Currently, Hong Kong's  e-Channels are situated at all border crossing points. A person who holds a Hong Kong Identity Card (HKID) inserts the card into a slot to enter the first eGate and then has their thumbprint scanned to pass through the second eGate. The Frequent Visitor program was further expanded to nationals of the following countries.  Such arrangements are reciprocal and eligible Hong Kong Special Administrative Region passport holders may also enrol for the respective automated border clearance schemes under these countries:
 Republic of Korea enrolled under Smart Entry Service (SES) scheme (Since 16 December 2013)
 Singapore (Since 22 September 2014)
 Germany (Since 1 November 2014)
 Australia (Since 20 June 2016)
 Thailand (Since 15 September 2018)

India
India uses the differentiation in passport stamp colours – entry in blue, exit in red – to quickly trace a passenger's movements. The stamp can be rectangular, circular or oval.

Indonesia
Entry stamp is only issued to the holder of Indonesian travel documents, while other nationalities will instead receive an entry sticker affixed to the passport showing the duration limit of their stay. Exit stamp is still normally issued to all travellers departing from Indonesia.

Iran
Iran applies an oval shaped stamp with blue ink for entry and a square shaped stamp with red ink for exit. All dates written on the stamps are in the Solar Hijri calendar, and it is written in Persian.

Iraq
Iraq passport stamps differ depending upon whether the checkpoint is located in Kurdistan Region, or the rest of Iraq.

Israel

Traveling with passports containing Israeli entry/exit stamps to certain Arab nations may lead to a denial of entry, because of the Arab League boycott of Israel. Since January 2013, Israel no longer stamps foreign passports at Ben Gurion Airport, giving passengers a piece of paper instead. Passports are still (as of February 2013) stamped at Erez Crossing when traveling into and out of Gaza. Also, the passports are still stamped (as of February 2014) at the land borders of Jordan River Crossing and Yitzhak Rabin Crossing with Jordan.

Japan

Jordan

Laos

Macau
Immigration stamps applied by Macau's immigration service under Portuguese administration had slightly different borders depending on whether the person arrived by land, sea, or air. After the transfer of sovereignty from Portugal to China in 1999, passport stamps naming the points of entry and departure were introduced, but all in the same ink color. Beginning of 9 July 2013, the Public Security Police Force of Macau no longer stamps passport and instead, visitors will receive a printed arrival card.

Malaysia
Malaysian immigration authorities apply stamps for both entry and exit in all foreign passports and non-biometric Malaysian passports without in-built microchips. Biometric Malaysian passports are usually not stamped as all movements in and out of the country are recorded electronically in the microchip.

Malaysian entry stamps for non-citizens and non-residents are applied in blue or black rectangle. They bear the date of entry, point of entry and terms of entry. Entry stamps for residents are also applied in blue ink but have an oval shape and bear the date and point of entry. Exit stamps are applied in red triangle. They bear the date and point of departure.

A peculiarity is the autonomy of the Malaysian states of Sabah and Sarawak in immigration affairs. This is attributed to the history of the federation of Malaysia, whereby in 1963, Malaya, North Borneo, Sarawak and Singapore merged to form Malaysia, with the three latter pre-merger entities granted partial autonomy. (Singapore eventually was expelled from the union.) Foreign visitors who travel to the two states from Peninsular Malaysia are required to fill in immigration forms and get new stamps on their passports. There is also immigration control for travel between Sabah and Sarawak. Previously, Malaysian citizens from the Peninsular were required to present their passports and have them stamped as well; while they are currently still subjected to immigration control, passports are no longer required for social visits not more than three months.

Between 1998 and 2011, foreign visitors who entered Malaysia via train from Singapore were cleared electronically without their passports being stamped. The change was due to the dispute between Malaysia and Singapore regarding Malaysian-owned railway land in Singapore. The Malaysian railway operator, Keretapi Tanah Melayu (KTM) had its intercity rail southern terminus at Tanjong Pagar railway station in downtown Singapore, which also housed the border controls of both Malaysia and Singapore for rail passengers before 1998. In 1998, Singapore moved its immigration checkpoint northward to Woodlands Train Checkpoint near the actual Malaysia-Singapore border but Malaysia refused to move its checkpoint, resulting in the anomaly that passengers travelling towards Malaysia were granted entry to Malaysia before passing through Singapore exit controls. Instead of passport stamps, foreign visitors were given disembarkation cards stamped with "KTM Tg Pagar, Singapura" and the date of entry, which would be collected upon departure from Malaysia and a handwritten note indicating the entry would be endorsed in the passport along with the exit stamp. Passengers travelling to Singapore were not affected as Malaysian exit controls were carried out on board trains at the Johor Bahru railway station, where immigration officers endorsed passports by stamping or handwriting. The anomaly was resolved on 1 July 2011, when Tanjong Pagar railway station was closed and Woodlands Train Checkpoint became the railway terminus in Singapore with co-location of border control facilities of both countries. Foreign visitors entering Malaysia by rail have their passports checked and stamped by Malaysian immigration officers at Woodlands Train Checkpoint after clearing Singapore exit controls.

Maldives

Myanmar
With the introduction of e-visas, entry stamps into Myanmar at the airports of Yangon, Mandalay and Naypyidaw, the only three entry checkpoints where e-visas are allowed, have been modified to indicate such method of entry.

Nepal
Nepal is one of the few countries which use sticker stamps. Nepalese immigration authorities use separate Arrival and Departure stickers for entry and exit on all types of passports.

Oman
As of December 2017, one who obtains a visa on arrival does not get a round entry stamp. Instead they get a rectangular, blue stamp that states the entry date and validity of the visa. This seems to, however, be the case only when arriving at Muscat International Airport. At land borders, the rectangular stamp is accompanied by a round, blue entry stamp. A round, red exit stamp is applied at all points of exit.

Pakistan
A circular entry stamp in black ink is applied to passports of all nationalities at the time of entry. A triangular multi colored entry stamp was used until 2015. An exit stamp is also applied to all passports when leaving the country. Exit stamp in use at present is rectangular in shape and black in color.

Philippines
At airports, red ink is applied for arrivals/entry while green is applied for departure/exit. As a general rule, passports of all travelers regardless of their nationality (including Philippine passport holders), need to be stamped at both entry and exit points. The attending officer also writes down the flight number and stamps the passenger's boarding pass upon departure with the same stamp that is used for departure. The shape and/or designs of the stamps are changed every five to six years. Recently, Philippine passport holders may opt arriving via E-gate, wherein a sticker will be printed and must be placed on the passport. Sticker contains name, passport number, flight number, terminal of arrival, and date of arrival and time.

Saudi Arabia
Saudi entry stamps are applied in black or blue ink. Entry stamps are applied in oval shape while exit stamps are applied in rounded rectangule. All dates written on the stamps are in the Islamic calendar, and it is written in Arabic. There is no English on the stamps, except for the "EXIT", "ENTRY" and 'K.S.A.' written on the stamps.

Singapore
Singapore entry stamps are applied in blue or black and either rectangle for those entitled to 14 days, rounded rectangle for those entitled to 30 days stay, or hexagon for those entitled to 90 day stay. Exit stamps are applied in green circle. Both depict the date of entry/exit and entry stamps also state the terms of entry and permitted duration of stay.

Both entry and exit stamps do not name the point of entry/exit but indicate them by the use of letters of the alphabet – "A" is used for entry by air, namely through Changi Airport or Seletar Airport; "S" by sea though the Singapore Cruiseship Terminal or Tanah Merah Ferry Terminal; "T" by land via the Tuas Checkpoint; and "W" by land via the Woodlands Checkpoint. The entry stamp has the letter running along the border of the stamp together with a code number while the exit stamp has a single letter marked in the center of the stamp. From 22 April 2019, foreign travellers no longer get their passports stamped when they depart from Singapore. As of 21 October 2021, foreign travellers no longer get their passports stamped on arrival. This has been replaced by a record of entry email sent to the passenger.

Sri Lanka

South Korea
Entry stamp is applied in square and magenta ink, while exit stamp is applied in circle and cyan ink. Exit stamp is omitted to every passenger since 1 November 2016, unless specifically requested. Entry stamp is only omitted to Republic of Korea travel document holder since 10 February 2011. Beginning January 2018, landing slips are issued to visitors on arrival in South Korea instead of passport stamps, and on departure from South Korea no slips or passport stamps are issued (being unable to present the landing slip on departure does not affect a traveller's ability to clear immigration). Starting from June 2022 in Incheon International Airport, the landing slip is changed to an entry confirmation sticker pasted in the passport.

Taiwan

On 1 January 2021, a new set of stamps were issued, replacing the plum flower with an outline of the island of Taiwan, but keeping the calligraphic characters created by Dong Yang-zi (a renowned calligrapher in Taiwan).

Thailand
Immigration officer applies stamp on all passports upon arrival at or departure from Thailand. Since August 2020, entry stamps are in the shape of a waving flag applied in red ink, and exit stamps are ovals applied in blue ink.  Stamps bear the date and point of entry/exit, as well as an identification code running along the border of the stamps. Entry stamps for foreigners also state expiry date.

The automated passport control (APC) system has been available for Thai nationals since 2012 and more than 20 million have used it, whereas Suvarnabhumi Airport opened 8 automated immigration lanes for foreigners, Singaporeans and Hong Kongers have been allowed to use the system also. Once processed, the foreign travelers can leave the automatic channel and present their passport to a Thai immigration officer to be stamped.

Timor-Leste
Timor-Leste applies a full-page blue stamp along with a red entry stamp. Exit stamps are a black oval.

United Arab Emirates
UAE applies blue oval stamps on entry, along with a smaller blue rectangular stamp showing the valid length of stay. Exit stamps are green oval. However residents and UAE passport holders can pass without passport stamping through e-gates at Abu Dhabi International Airport , Dubai International Airport , Al Maktoum International Airport and Sharjah International Airport.

Vietnam
Vietnam passport stamps are rectangle and name the point of entry, date of entry and whether the person is exiting or entering the country by using an arrow out of or into a box similar to the Schengen passport stamps. Mode of entry is indicated by an icon and also differentiated by the colour of the stamp – blue for air, red for land crossings. The permitted length of stay is printed with a separate stamp and the final date handwritten.

Africa

Algeria

Botswana

Burkina Faso

Burundi

Cameroon

Egypt

Eritrea

Eswatini

Ethiopia

French overseas departments (Mayotte and Réunion)

When arriving in and departing from the French overseas departments of Mayotte and Réunion, French Border Police officers stamp travelers' travel documents according to the following rules:

Travellers flying directly from metropolitan France to Mayotte or Réunion only undergo border checks by the French Border Police at the departure airport in metropolitan France and not on arrival at Dzaoudzi–Pamandzi International Airport in Mayotte or Roland Garros Airport in Réunion. However, as third-country nationals (who do not benefit from one of the exemptions in the right-hand column above) are required to receive a passport stamp, the French Border Police will give them an information sheet when they leave metropolitan France informing them that they should present themselves to the French Border Police at the arrival airport to receive a passport stamp. On the other hand, travellers flying directly from Mayotte or Réunion to metropolitan France undergo border checks by the French Border Police both on departure and on arrival, when their travel documents will be stamped accordingly.

Gabon

Gambia

Ghana

Guinea Bissau

Kenya

Malawi

Morocco

Mozambique

Nigeria

Rwanda

Senegal

South Africa

Tanzania

Tunisia

Tunisia stamps passports upon both entry and exit. In the photo below, the red stamp indicates the entry date, while the black stamp indicates the exit date.

Uganda

Zambia

Zimbabwe

Europe

Schengen Area

All 27 European countries within the Schengen Area have entry and exit stamps of a uniform design. As of April 2016, at a national level, 11 Schengen countries (Estonia, Finland, Greece, Hungary, Latvia, Lithuania, Malta, Poland, Portugal, Slovakia and Spain) have developed computer databases recording entries and exits of third-country nationals (i.e. travellers who are not EU, EEA or Swiss citizens) at external border crossing points. However, on a Schengen-wide level, there is no centralised computer database that tracks entries and exits at all of the external border crossing points of the 27 Schengen countries, nor are entry and exit records from national databases shared between countries. As a result, law enforcement officials continue to rely on checking passport stamps as the primary way to check that travellers who do not have the right of free movement have not exceeded their length of permitted stay in the Schengen Area.

Regulation (EU) 2017/2226 envisages the establishment of an Entry-Exit System (EES) which will record third-country nationals' entries and exits when they cross the external borders of the Schengen Area in a central database, replacing passport stamps. As of August 2022, EES is expected to enter into operation at the end of May 2023.

There are no systematic immigration checks when travelling between Schengen countries (i.e. crossing the internal borders of the Schengen Area). Passport stamps are never issued when travelling between Schengen countries, even when immigration checks between Schengen countries are temporarily re-introduced.

When travelling to/from a non-Schengen country (i.e. crossing the external borders of the Schengen Area), the rules on stamping travel documents are as follows:

Border officials are required, by law, to stamp the travel documents of third country nationals who do not qualify for one of the exemptions listed in the right hand column, even when border controls have been relaxed. Exceptionally, if stamping a person's travel document would cause serious difficulties (such as political persecution), border officials can instead issue a sheet of paper detailing the person's name, travel document number and entry date and location. However, in practice, border officials do not always stamp the travel documents of travellers as legally required. If a person who should have received an entry stamp cannot show one either upon request by a law enforcement officer or upon leaving the Schengen Area to a border official, the officer can presume that the person has been staying illegally in the Schengen Area and can expel him/her, unless the person can demonstrate using credible evidence (such as transport tickets and accommodation receipts) that he/she has not exceeded his/her permitted length of stay in the Schengen Area.

Also, whilst by law persons enjoying the right of freedom of movement are not to receive a passport stamp, in practice, upon request, a stamp may be given – see the gallery below for an example of an entry stamp being issued upon request by an EU citizen. Similarly, although by law heads of state are not to receive a passport stamp, in practice, this is not always followed. For example, when arriving for the 37th G8 summit in Deauville, United States President Barack Obama had his passport stamped at Deauville – Saint-Gatien Airport. Similarly, when President Obama attended the 2009 Strasbourg–Kehl summit, his diplomatic passport was stamped on arrival at Strasbourg Airport on 3 April 2009, and after visiting Prague, Czech Republic, his diplomatic passport was stamped on departure from Prague Ruzyně Airport on 5 April 2009.

Although, according to EU rules, third country nationals who hold residence permits should not have their travel documents stamped, France nevertheless requires third country nationals holding a visa de long séjour valant titre de séjour (a long-stay visa serving additionally as a residence permit for up to one year) to receive a passport stamp upon their first entry to the Schengen Area as a part of the process to validate the visa as a residence permit; without an entry stamp, the process cannot be completed.

Third-country nationals who otherwise fulfil all the criteria for admission into the Schengen area must not be denied entry for the sole reason that there is no remaining empty space in their travel document to affix a stamp; instead, the stamp should be affixed on a separate sheet of paper.

Entry and exit stamps are applied in black ink, except for the red date stamp and a two-digit security code in the middle. The two-digit security code must be changed at least once a month, although some Schengen countries (such as Greece) change security codes every day. The stamps bear the country abbreviation within a circle of stars in the top left hand corner, the name of the entry/exit border crossing point in Latin alphabet at the bottom, and an icon in the top right hand corner to denote the mode of entry/exit. Below the name of the border crossing point is an identifying number – a record is kept of the identity of the border officer to whom a given stamp is assigned at any given time. Entry stamps are rectangular and have an arrow into a square, while exit stamps are rectangular with rounded corners and have an arrow out of a square. The stamps do not indicate any maximum permitted duration of stay.

Border guards are required to ensure the secure storage of passport stamps in locked safes between shifts. Border posts are advised to set out clear responsibilities and instructions for the distribution and use of passport stamps.

According to European Commission recommendations and guidelines, stamps should be affixed in travel documents by border officials in the following manner:
 in chronological order
 in a horizontal position
 in a clear and straight manner (i.e. with enough ink and not over the edge of a page)
 the exit stamp should be affixed in the proximity of the entry stamp
 no stamp should be affixed over another stamp or over the machine readable zone of a visa
 if the travel document contains a single-entry Schengen visa, the stamp should be affixed over the edge of the visa, but without affecting the legibility of the conditions and security features of the visa
 if the travel document contains a multiple-entry Schengen visa, the stamp should be affixed on the page facing the one on which the visa is affixed

If a third-country national is refused entry to the Schengen Area, the border official is required to affix an entry stamp in the travel document, cancel the stamp by an indelible cross in blank ink and write the letter corresponding to the reason for the refusal of entry to the right-hand side of the cancelled stamp.

By contrast, if a border official has affixed a stamp in a travel document by mistake (as opposed to a refusal of entry), the stamp can be annulled by drawing two parallel lines through the top left-hand corner.

In view of the coronavirus pandemic, starting from 16 March 2020 there is a temporary restriction on the entry of third-country nationals (i.e. travellers who are not EU/EEA/Swiss/British citizens and family members with the right of free movement) to the Schengen Area for non-essential travel. However, third-country nationals who are holders of long-term visas or residence permits or are family members of EU/EEA/Swiss/British citizens are exempt from this restriction. Further, third-country nationals 'with an essential function or need' (such as healthcare workers, transport personnel, aid workers, military personnel, seasonal agricultural workers), passengers in transit, those travelling 'for imperative family reasons' and those 'in need of international protection or for other humanitarian reasons' are exempt from this restriction. Citizens of the European micro-states (Andorra, the Holy See, Monaco and San Marino) are also exempt from this restriction. In addition, citizens of Serbia, North Macedonia, Montenegro and Turkey are exempt from this restriction if they are stranded abroad and are repatriated to their country of origin. 
Third-country nationals (not covered by one of the exemptions from the temporary restriction of entry for non-essential reasons) who seek to enter the Schengen Area will be refused entry at the border crossing point and will receive a refusal of entry form (with the reason of refusal marked as "I", i.e. a threat to public health), as well as a passport stamp cancelled by an indelible cross in black ink and the letter "I" on the right hand side.

The obligation imposed by European law on national border authorities to stamp travel documents of certain travellers should not prevent the development of automated border control systems which are then made available to those who are required to have their travel documents stamped when crossing the external border of the Schengen Area. One solution is to dedicate separate lanes to third-country nationals and to have a border guard physically positioned next to the automated border gates used by these lanes who can stamp travel documents where required: this has been adopted by the Finnish Border Guard at the automated border gates in Helsinki Airport, where eligible users (who are required to receive a passport stamp) include holders of Canadian, Japanese, South Korean and United States biometric passports, and in the Port of Helsinki, where eligible users (who are required to receive a passport stamp) include Russian citizens, as well as by the Portuguese Serviço de Estrangeiros e Fronteiras at the automated border gates in Lisbon Airport where eligible users (who are required to receive a passport stamp) include holders of Angolan and Brazilian passports and holders of diplomatic/service passports. This approach has also been adopted in Italy, where eligible users of eGates include holders of Australian, Canadian, Israeli, Japanese, New Zealand, Singaporean, South Korean, United States and Vatican biometric passports. A similar but slightly different solution has been adopted by the Dutch Royal Marechaussee at the Privium iris recognition automated border gates at Amsterdam Airport Schiphol, where eligible users include registered EU/EEA/Swiss citizens, US citizens who are Global Entry members, and all nationals who are holders of diplomatic passports, as well as by the German Federal Police at the ABG Plus iris recognition automated border gates at Frankfurt Airport where eligible users include registered EU/EEA/Swiss citizens and US citizens who are Global Entry members: when eligible third-country nationals use Privium/ABG Plus, after their iris is scanned and verified, a different gate/door/turnstile opens to that for EU/EEA/Swiss citizens and the third-country national user is directed to a lane which leads them to the front of the queue for manual passport checks at immigration desks, where the border guard stamps the user's passport. Another possible solution would be to design the automated border gates to print a paper slip with an entry or exit stamp on it, as well as the user's name and travel document number, whenever the user is a traveller who is subject to the requirement to have his/her travel document stamped.

Albania
Although Albania is not a European Union or Schengen Area member state, and is outside the EU freedom of movement area, it has adopted the common Schengen design for passport stamps. In addition, passports of EU/EFTA countries, Andorra, Monaco and San Marino are not stamped.

Andorra
Entry from France or Spain requires no formalities. However, a souvenir stamp is issued on request at the border.

Belarus

Belarus is a member of the Union State of Russia and Belarus but, like Russia, still has its own passport stamps. Belarus passport stamps have the state's name in the Belarusian language: Republic of Belarus, a chevron (facing to the left for entry, to the right for exit), date and name of the checkpoint.

Bulgaria
Although Bulgaria is a European Union member state, it has not yet joined the Schengen Area. Nonetheless, it has adopted the common Schengen design for passport stamps.

Cyprus

Although Cyprus is a European Union member state, it has not yet joined the Schengen Area. Nonetheless, it has adopted the common Schengen design for passport stamps.

Ireland

Kosovo

Liechtenstein
Liechtenstein is a member of the Schengen area with no borders with non-Schengen countries; thus, no passport stamps are issued. However, for a nominal fee, a souvenir stamp can be issued at the Liechtenstein Center tourist office.

Monaco
The border with France is completely open. However, a souvenir stamp is given on request at the tourist office. This stamp can no longer be placed in an official passport, but can be placed in a paper "souvenir passport" or in another unofficial document like a notebook or journal.

Montenegro

North Macedonia
Although North Macedonia is not a European Union or Schengen Area member state, and is outside the EU freedom of movement area, it has adopted the common Schengen design for passport stamps. In addition, passports of EU/EFTA countries and UK are not stamped.

Romania
Romania is not currently a member of the Schengen Area, however, being in the European Union since 2007, Romanian entry and exit stamps have been harmonised with the format of the stamps issued by Schengen states.

Russia
Entry and exit stamps are placed in passports regardless of citizenship; Russian passports are stamped as well as foreign ones, except the Internal Passports, with which Russian citizens may travel to a few countries of the CIS. The stamp shows the name of the country (КПП below the country name stands for checkpoint – контрольно-пропускной пункт), the date, the name of the checkpoint and the personal code of the immigration official applying the stamp. Stamp colours and series (the last number following the date) change every time in few years, currently the color of the stamps is red of 9 series, but it can be blue or crimson as well. Entry or exit is designated by a direction of an angle bracket in the stamp: if it points to the right, that denotes exit. Exit stamp placed left, and entrance stamp placed right on the passport page.

San Marino
Even though there is an open border agreement with Italy, visitors can have their passport stamped by the San Marino authority at the passport office in the city centre for a small fee.

Serbia
Serbia stamps both Serbian and foreign passports on exit, and foreign passports also on entry (until March 2018, foreign passports were not stamped on exit).

Turkey
Turkey, as a candidate member of the European Union, has adopted a design for passport stamps similar to that of the Schengen area.

Ukraine
Ukrainian passport stamps bear the country's name (since 2020 only country code UA), mode of travel (ship, train, vehicle, plane), code of the immigration officer, chevron (facing to the right for entry, to the left for exit), date, serial code (probably periodic), name of the checkpoint and its code. All are written in the Ukrainian language.

United Kingdom
The UK Border Force only stamps the travel documents of travellers entering the UK from outside the Common Travel Area who do not have the right of abode in the UK. When such travellers are granted leave to enter the UK, a stamp will generally be endorsed in their travel document, as the general rule laid down by section 4(1) of the Immigration Act 1971 is that power to give leave to enter the UK 'shall be exercised by notice in writing'. Passport stamps are in black ink and bear the name of the entry point, as well as the immigration officer's identification number.

Non-visa nationals entering as a visitor (except Australian, Canadian, Japanese, New Zealand, Singaporean, South Korean and United States citizens) receive a passport stamp with the endorsement 'Leave to enter for six months: employment and recourse to public funds prohibited'.

EU, EEA and Swiss citizens (regardless of whether they hold settled or pre-settled status under the EU Settlement Scheme in the UK) entering the UK on their passport or national identity card do not receive a stamp.

If the traveller is the holder of a visa/entry clearance or a person exempt from immigration control (e.g. a diplomat), he/she receives an open date passport stamp (i.e. a stamp that does not contain any leave conditions). Moreover, this entry passport stamp is stamped on the right edge of the visa/entry clearance (if the traveller has one) on the traveller's first entry to indicate that the document has been used, even if the document is valid for multiple entries.

The following table shows which travellers arriving in the UK from outside the Common Travel Area receive a passport stamp:

As a derogation from the general requirement to grant leave to enter the UK 'by notice in writing' in the form of a passport stamp (where a person without the right of abode and the right to free movement arrives in the UK from outside the Common Travel Area), UK Border Force officers are permitted by law to grant leave to enter by fax or e-mail, and may also grant leave to enter orally (including by telephone) if the traveller seeks to enter the UK as a visitor for up to 6 months.

All travellers from outside the Common Travel Area entering the UK using the ePassport gates (including those without the right of abode) do not receive a passport stamp. Non-visa nationals entering the UK as a visitor who successfully use an ePassport gate are granted 6 months' leave to enter (subject to conditions prohibiting employment and recourse to public funds) without receiving any written notice/endorsement.

Since 20 May 2019, Australian, Canadian, Japanese, New Zealand, Singaporean, South Korean and United States citizens who enter the UK as a visitor and are granted leave to enter for 6 months do not receive a passport stamp, regardless of whether they use an ePassport gate or a staffed counter. However, citizens of these countries who enter the UK with a Tier 5 (Temporary Worker – Creative and Sporting) Certificate of Sponsorship (for up to 3 months) or on a permitted paid engagement are not eligible to use the ePassport gates and must use a staffed counter, where they will receive a passport stamp.

When the transition period of the UK's withdrawal from the EU came to an end on 31 December 2020, EU, EEA and Swiss citizens became subject to immigration control. However, regardless of whether they hold settled or pre-settled status under the EU Settlement Scheme in the UK, EU, EEA and Swiss citizens continue not to receive a stamp when entering the UK on their passport or national identity card.

In the case of general aviation flights arriving in the UK from outside the Common Travel Area, travellers may not be inspected by the UK Border Force on arrival (depending on the risk assessment conducted on the basis of the travellers' information submitted in advance via the General Aviation Report (GAR) form) and may be 'remotely cleared' instead. In this case, no passport stamp is received.

Previously, all travellers entering the UK using the Iris Recognition Immigration System (including non-UK/EU/EEA/Swiss citizens) did not receive a passport stamp.

The UK Border Agency had a policy from 23 June 2008 until 4 November 2011 of conducting onboard clearance of some passengers travelling by coach at the juxtaposed controls at the Port of Calais and the Eurotunnel Calais Terminal. Passengers' travel documents were visually inspected by a UKBA officer on the coach, without the passengers having to disembark and pass through immigration control (where their travel documents would be scanned and, when required, stamped). This concession mainly applied to school groups travelling within the European Economic Area, though it was also extended to some other groups, such as elderly passengers, travellers with special needs, brownie and scout groups and sports teams. This policy meant that some passengers whose travel documents would usually be stamped did not receive a stamp on entering the UK.

Travellers arriving in the UK directly from the Channel Islands, Ireland and the Isle of Man are not subject to immigration checks as they are travelling within the Common Travel Area. Accordingly, no passport stamp is received.

There are no routine exit checks when departing from the UK for a destination outside the Common Travel Area by air, rail or sea. Instead, airline/rail/ferry companies obtain passengers' travel document information at check-in or on departure and transmit the information electronically to the UK Border Force. However, from time to time spot checks are carried out by the UK Border Force (in this case, travel documents are not stamped).

North America

Canada
Canada no longer routinely stamp passports upon entry. With effect from 2 April 2012, Border Services Officers of the Canada Border Services Agency will only stamp passports in the following circumstances:
 Seasonal agricultural workers
 Persons authorized to extend their stay in Canada
 Visitors arriving under a Parent/Grandparent super-visa
 Persons attaining permanent resident status at a port of entry
 Diplomatic visitors accredited to Canada arriving for the first time
 Persons issued a visitor record, limiting the duration of stay in Canada
 At the specific request of the traveler arriving at an international airport equipped with a Primary Inspection Kiosk

Cayman Islands

Costa Rica 
Costa Rica does not apply exit stamps, only entry stamps placed into a passport.

Cuba
Cuban Government by policy does not stamp US Passports.

French overseas departments and collectivities

When arriving in and departing from the French overseas departments of Guadeloupe and Martinique and the French overseas collectivities of Saint Barthélemy, Saint Martin and Saint Pierre and Miquelon, French Border Police officers stamp travellers' travel documents according to the following rules:

Travellers flying directly from metropolitan France to Guadeloupe, Martinique or Saint Pierre and Miquelon only undergo border checks by the French Border Police at the departure airport in metropolitan France and not on arrival in the French overseas department/collectivity. However, as third-country nationals (who do not benefit from one of the exemptions in the right-hand column above) are required to receive a passport stamp, the French Border Police will give them an information sheet when they leave metropolitan France informing them that they should present themselves to the French Border Police at the arrival airport to receive a passport stamp. On the other hand, travellers flying directly from Guadeloupe, Martinique or Saint Pierre and Miquelon to metropolitan France undergo border checks by the French Border Police both on departure and on arrival, when their travel documents will be stamped accordingly.

Whilst the rules for stamping travel documents of travellers arriving in and departing from the French overseas departments/collectivities mentioned above are based upon the rules which apply in metropolitan France and the Schengen Area (see the section above), important differences exist between the two sets of rules. For example, when crossing the external border of the Schengen Area, only family members of EU/EEA/Swiss citizens who hold a residence card issued under Article 10 of Directive 2004/38/EC and who are accompanying or joining their EU, EEA and Swiss citizen family member exercising the right of freedom of movement are exempt from having their travel documents stamped, whereas in the French overseas departments/collectivities mentioned above, more generous rules apply — when entering/leaving Guadeloupe/Martinique/Saint Pierre and Miquelon, a family member of an EU/EEA/Swiss citizen who holds a residence card issued by an EU/EEA member state or Switzerland under Article 10 of Directive 2004/38/EC is exempt from having his/her travel document stamped regardless of whether he/she is accompanying/joining his/her EU/EEA/Swiss citizen family member; when entering/leaving Saint Barthélemy and Saint Martin, a family member of an EU/EEA/Swiss citizen who holds a residence card issued by an EU/EEA member state or Switzerland is exempt from having his/her travel document stamped regardless of whether he/she is accompanying/joining his/her EU/EEA/Swiss citizen family member and regardless of whether the residence card was issued under Article 10 of Directive 2004/38/EC. Another example relates to third-country nationals who hold a residence permit issued by a Schengen member state — when crossing the external border of the Schengen Area, his/her travel document should not be stamped, but when entering/leaving a French overseas department/collectivity, whilst he/she is not required to hold a visa for a short stay not exceeding 90 days in a 180-day period, his/her travel document will be stamped upon entry and exit.

Another exception applies in the case of the French overseas collectivity of Saint Martin—travellers who in principle are subject to the obligation to have their travel documents stamped but who have cleared immigration control in Sint Maarten will not have their passport stamped when they enter/leave the French side of Saint Martin.

The design of passport stamps issued in the French overseas departments/collectivities differs from those issued in metropolitan France/the Schengen Area. Previously, entry stamps issued in French overseas departments/collectivities were rectangular, whilst exit stamps were hexagonal. Under the current design, both entry and exit stamps issued in French overseas departments/collectivities are hexagonal and have a similar design to Schengen Area stamps. The top left corner states Outre-Mer and F, and indicates the 3-digit INSEE code for the overseas department/collectivity where the stamp was issued (971 for Guadeloupe, 972 for Martinique, 975 for Saint Pierre and Miquelon, 978 for Saint Martin).

Haiti

Mexico
Mexico does not apply exit stamps, only entry stamps placed into a passport.

Panama

United States

The three-letter Port of Entry code at the top of the entry stamp is assigned and maintained by the Department of State. It is different from the IATA airport code.

The actual deadline to leave the U.S. for those admitted on a non-immigrant status is written at the bottom of the stamp, placed in the passport (when entering by air or sea) or on a green I-94W form stapled into the passport.

With the introduction of Automated Passport Control (APC), entries are not always stamped into passports of travelers using the kiosks (especially US and Canadian passports). There are custom slips printed out from the machine, which are stamped by immigration and then handed over to customs.  However, details of arrival and departure records are still made available at the website of US Customs and Border Protection.

Oceania

Australia
The Australian government no longer stamps travellers’ passports on arrival or departure from Australia as a matter of principle, regardless of whether travellers go through SmartGate or are processed manually at a counter.

Fiji

French overseas territories (French Polynesia, New Caledonia, Wallis and Futuna)
When arriving in and departing from the French overseas territories of French Polynesia, New Caledonia and Wallis and Futuna, French Border Police officers stamp travellers' travel documents according to the following rules:

When travelling between the French overseas territories situated in the Pacific Ocean (for example, when travelling directly by plane from New Caledonia to French Polynesia), unless qualifying for one of the exemptions in the right hand column in the table above, a traveller will receive a passport stamp in his/her travel document upon departure from New Caledonia and another stamp upon arrival in French Polynesia.

Whilst the rules for stamping travel documents of travellers arriving in and departing from the French overseas territories in the Pacific Ocean are based upon the rules which apply in metropolitan France and the Schengen Area (see the section above), important differences exist between the two sets of rules. For example, when crossing the external border of the Schengen Area, only family members of EU/EEA/Swiss citizens who hold a residence card issued under Article 10 of Directive 2004/38/EC and who are accompanying or joining their EU, EEA and Swiss citizen family member exercising the right of freedom of movement are exempt from having their travel documents stamped, whereas in the French overseas territories in the Pacific, more generous rules apply — a family member of an EU/EEA/Swiss citizen who holds a residence permit issued by an EU/EEA member state or Switzerland is exempt from having his/her travel document stamped regardless of whether he/she is accompanying/joining his/her EU/EEA/Swiss citizen family member and regardless of whether his/her residence permit was issued under Article 10 of Directive 2004/38/EC. Another example relates to third-country nationals who hold a residence permit issued by a Schengen member state – when crossing the external border of the Schengen Area, his/her travel document should not be stamped, but when entering/leaving a French overseas territory in the Pacific, whilst he/she is not required to hold a visa for a short stay not exceeding 90 days in a 180-day period, his/her travel document will be stamped upon entry and exit.

The design of passport stamps issued in the French overseas territories in the Pacific differs from those issued in metropolitan France/the Schengen Area. Previously, entry stamps issued in French overseas territories in the Pacific were rectangular, whilst exit stamps were hexagonal. Under the current design, both entry and exit stamps issued in French overseas territories in the Pacific are hexagonal, and are similar in design to Schengen Area passport stamps. The top left corner states Outre-Mer and F, and indicates the 3-digit INSEE code for the overseas territory where the stamp was issued (988 for New Caledonia).

New Zealand
Since March 2018, the New Zealand Customs Service ceased stamping passports for Australian permanent residents and New Zealand residents. General entry stamps continue to be used for temporary visa holders.

On arrival in New Zealand, travellers who are neither New Zealand nor Australian citizens or permanent residents who are granted entry into the country will receive a 'Visitor Visa' rectangular stamp in their travel document.

New Zealand and Australian citizens do not have their passports stamped on arrival in New Zealand unless specifically requested.

Travellers using eGate (available to holders of a New Zealand, Australian, Chinese, Canadian, Dutch, French, German, Irish, Japanese, Singaporean, South Korean, United Kingdom or United States ePassport aged 12 years or over) will not have their passports stamped on arrival in New Zealand.

For all travellers, passports are not stamped on departure from New Zealand regardless of nationality and whether using an immigration desk or eGate.

Niue
Niue passport stamps bear the name of the country, a map outline of Niue, date and location of entry/departure.

Vanuatu
The passport stamp bears the country name, date and port of entry/departure.

South America

Argentina

Brazil
Holder of Brazilian passports entering or departing from Brazil will not receive a passport stamp. However, other nationals will go through customs and receive a stamp for both entry and exit. When entering Brazil by car from another country such as Argentina or Paraguay, few people go through customs and thus rarely receive stamps in their passport.

Chile

Colombia

Since December 2019, Colombia uses an updated, smaller stamp for both entries and exits featuring the letter E which was previously used only for exits (the letter I is no longer used). For exits, migration officers cross out the E.

French Guiana

When arriving in and departing from the French overseas department of French Guiana, French Border Police officers stamp travellers' travel documents according to the following rules:

Travellers flying directly from metropolitan France to French Guiana only undergo border checks by the French Border Police at the departure airport in metropolitan France and not on arrival in French Guiana. However, as third-country nationals (who do not benefit from one of the exemptions in the right-hand column above) are required to receive a passport stamp, the French Border Police will give them an information sheet when they leave metropolitan France informing them that they should present themselves to the French Border Police at the arrival airport to receive a passport stamp. On the other hand, travellers flying directly from French Guiana to metropolitan France undergo border checks by the French Border Police both on departure and on arrival, when their travel documents will be stamped accordingly.

Both entry and exit stamps issued in French Guiana are hexagonal, and are similar in design to Schengen Area passport stamps. The top left corner states Outre-Mer and F, and indicates the 3-digit INSEE code (973) for French Guiana.

Peru

Venezuela

Countries/Regions not issuing exit immigration stamps
In some countries, there is no formal control by immigration officials of travel documents upon exit. Consequently, exit stamps are not placed in passports.
Exit may be recorded by immigration authorities via information provided to them by carriers when the passenger departs from the country.

No exit control
  United States of America
  Canada
  Mexico (by air)
  Bahamas
  Ireland
  United Kingdom (Border Force officers do not carry out systematic checks of travel documents on passengers travelling to a destination outside the Common Travel Area by air, rail or sea (though from time to time spot checks are carried out – in this case passports are not stamped); instead, airline/rail/ferry companies obtain passengers' travel document information at check-in or on departure and transmit the information electronically to the UK Border Force)

Formal entry or exit control without passport stamping

 Albania (Entry & Exit stamp may be issued upon request)
 Argentina (Digital entry confirmation on arrival only)
 Australia (Entry & Exit stamps no longer issued. Instead, you may pull up electronic record of your entries & exits)
 China (Exit stamp issued upon request when using e-Gate)
 Costa Rica (only at Costa Rican airports; different entry and exit stamps are made at the border crossing with Panama)
 El Salvador
 Fiji 
 Hong Kong (no entry or exit stamps are issued, instead landing slips are issued upon arrival only)
 Iran
 Israel (no entry or exit stamps are issued at Ben Gurion Airport, instead landing slips are issued upon arrival and departure)
 Japan (Exit stamp issued upon request & when not using e-Gate since July 2019)
 Macau (no entry or exit stamps are issued, instead landing slips are issued upon arrival only)
 New Zealand
 North Macedonia (Entry & Exit stamp may be issued upon request for EU & EFTA citizens)
 Qatar (exit stamp no longer issued but may be requested)
 South Korea (since 1 November 2016)
 Panama (only at Panamanian airports; different entry and exit stamps are made at the border crossing with Costa Rica)
 Taiwan (Republic of China) (exit stamp issued upon request & when not using e-Gate)
 Singapore (no exit stamps since 22 April 2019, no entry stamps since 21 October 2021)
 Saint Kitts and Nevis

However, in some of these countries a departure card is stamped.

See also

 Gallery of passport stamps by country or territory
Revenue Stamp

Notes

References
 Report from the Commission to the European Parliament and the Council on the operation of the provisions on stamping of the travel documents of third-country nationals in accordance with Articles 10 and 11 of Regulation (EC) No 562/2006 establishing a Community Code on the rules governing the movement of persons across borders (Schengen Borders Code). European Commission. 2009. Retrieved 2012-06-26.
 Regulation (EC) No 562/2006 of the European Parliament and of the Council of 15 March 2006 establishing a Community Code on the rules governing the movement of persons across borders (Schengen Borders Code)

External links
 PassportStamp A site for recording passport stamp visits
 Passport stamps from the whole world – 181 countries, 748 scans